Thomas George Macarthy ( – 19 August 1912) was a New Zealand brewer and benefactor. He was born in London, England, in about 1834 and died in 1912 in Wellington, New Zealand.

He died childless and his substantial business interests were put into a trust for educational purposes. When prohibition was an issue in the 1920s, the trust's continued maintenance of his brewing business was attacked by Robert Stout.

In 2012, Macarthy was posthumously inducted into the New Zealand Business Hall of Fame.

References

1830s births
1912 deaths
New Zealand philanthropists
19th-century New Zealand businesspeople
English emigrants to New Zealand
19th-century philanthropists